The Wynne Wholesale Commercial Historic District encompasses a small collection of historic commercial properties in Wynne, Arkansas.  It extends for two blocks along West Merriman Avenue, west of Martin Luther King Jr. Boulevard, and includes four historic buildings: the Wynne Municipal Water Works, the Wynne Wholesale Grocer Company building, the R. J. Jackson Gin Company's cotton gin, and the Sharp Floral Building.  A fifth building, the Wynne Ice & Coal Company's ice house, also stands in the district, but has been recently modified.  These building are representative of wholesale business activities that took place in Wynne in the first half of the 20th century.

The district was listed on the National Register of Historic Places in 2010.

See also
National Register of Historic Places listings in Cross County, Arkansas

References

Buildings and structures completed in 1905
Cross County, Arkansas
Historic districts on the National Register of Historic Places in Arkansas
National Register of Historic Places in Cross County, Arkansas
1905 establishments in Arkansas